Pitot is a surname. Notable people with the surname include:

Henri Pitot (1695–1771), French hydraulic engineer and the inventor of the Pitot tube
James Pitot (1784–1831), the second Mayor of New Orleans
François Pitot, Captain of the French frigate Vengeance during the Quasi-War

See also
 Pitot House, a historic landmark in New Orleans
 Pitot tube, a pressure measurement instrument used to measure fluid flow velocity